Three ships in the Confederate States Navy were named 'CSS Tennessee'  was a steamship, built in 1853 and seized by the Confederate States in 1861; she was recaptured by the Union in the Battle of New Orleans and commissioned into the United States Navy as ; she was later renamed USS Mobile'' when the ironclad  was captured in 1864
  was burned at the stocks prior to completion
  was an ironclad launched in 1863, commissioned in 1864 and was captured at the Battle of Mobile Bay, and renamed

See also
 
 
 Tennessee (disambiguation)

Ship names